Ranajit Kunwar was Nepalese governor and military personnel in the Kingdom of Nepal. He was a son of Ramakrishna Kunwar of Kunwar family. He served as governor of Jumla, Pyuthan and sub-ordinate administrator under Amar Singh Thapa at Srinagar of Garhwal province. He suppressed the rebellion of Jumla as a governor. He fought at the battle of Khadbuda where he killed King Pradyumna Shah of Garhwal. He was the grandfather of Jang Bahadur Kunwar Ranaji who later became the Maharaja of Kaski & Lamjung and Prime Minister of Nepal.

Early life

He was born to Gorkhali Sardar Ramakrishna Kunwar on 1753 A.D. He was the first cousin of Chandrabir Kunwar, father of Balbhadra Kunwar.

Career

After the consolidation of Pyuthan in November 1786, Ramakrishna Kunwar opened ammunition factory at Pyuthan. He died there and was succeeded by his son Ranajit Kunwar for the operation of the factory. Ranajit participated as reinforcement to Gorkhali forces under Chautariya Shree Krishna Shah in the Kuti Axis (1st division) in the first campaign of the Sino-Nepalese War on 1788 A.D. He then acted as subordinate commander under Kaji Abhiman Singh Basnyat at Kerung Axis on 1792 A.D. Sino-Nepalese War.

The inhabitants of Jumla did not accept the conquest by Gorkhali rulers and they frequently invoked rebellions on the Gorkhali administration. A royal order then warned the residents of Jumla against rebellion with punishment according to their caste. A royal order issued on Tuesday Jestha Badi 11, 1850 V.S. (May 1793) mentions that on 1849 V.S. (1792 A.D.), the locals led by the former ruler Sobhan Shahi had rebelled in opposition to Subba (governor) Ranajit Kanwar at Jumla. The inhabitants were then consequently enslaved upon that incident. The royal order frees all the slaves of that Jumla rebellion incident on Tuesday Jestha Badi 11, 1850 V.S. Similarly, in another incident, Subba Ranajit Kunwar imposed heavy fines on the inhabitants of Jumla as a result of their rebellion in 1793. A royal order of King Girvan Yuddha Bikram Shah dated Shrawan Sudi 2, 1859 V.S. (July 1802) shows that Ranajit Kunwar was in his tenure at Jumla on 1851 Vikram Samvat (1794 A.D.). Finally, Ranjit Kanwar was replaced by Jog Narayan Malla as Subba (governor) of Jumla on Baisakh Badi 1, 1851 (April 1794).

The royal orders dated Bhadra Badi 11, 1853 (August 1796) mentions Subba Ranajit as in-charge of fort construction at Pyuthan. The local Amalidar of Isma was also instructed for necessary preparations for construction of Pyuthan fort under Subba Ranajit. He was further ordered to repair bridges over the Madi river and build checkposts at Sheoraj and Dhunwakot.

An administrative document from Jumla dated Chaitra Sudi 7, 1857 (April 1801) shows ‘’Subba’’ Ranajit's administrative order to Alidatta Jaisi of Sija to restore the revenue assignment for Kanakasundari temple which was discontinued by the Amali (i.e. local administrator). Similarly, document dated Chaitra Sudi 7, 1857 (April 1801) and Jestha Badi 1, 1858 (May 1801) shows his tax exemption and land allotment decisions as a Subba (governor). On Baisakh Sudi 10, 1861 V.S. (May 1804), the royal orders from King Girvan Yuddha Bikram Shah instructed Sardar Ranajit Kunwar along with Sardar Angad Khawas and Subedar Nirbhaya Simha Thapa to investigate the conflict between King Samundra Sen of Bajhang and King Mandhir Shah of Bajura and take over the areas by military means and deport the obstructer to the capital.

King Pradyumna Shah of Garhwal Kingdom prepared for warfare by assembling 12,000 men of various groups such as Ramghads, Pundirs, Gujars, and Rajputs under a Gujjar Sardar Ramdayal Singh of Landhaur. On the other hand, Gorkhali forces were led by overall commander Amar Singh Thapa, and his subordinate commanders Bhaktibir Thapa and Ranajit Kunwar. The battle took place at Khadbuda on 22nd Marga 1860 V.S. (January 1804). Pradyumna Shah on his horseback was having a conversation with Miya Dulal Singh of Prithvipur and momentarily, Ranajit shot Pradyumna Shah to death. His shot proved successful as Garhwali soldiers ran away and the war finally ended. Bada Amar Simha appointed Ranajit as chief of one of the three revenue divisions of Garhwal namely Srinagar. The letter sent on Sunday, Bhadra Sudi 11, 1867 V.S. by Ranajit Kunwar to Bhimsen Thapa states his involvements in the western provinces of Kingdom of Nepal. Ranajit reports to the Bhimsen regarding the enemy forces of Barha Thakurai kings at Panthajada and war preparations by Gorkhali companies at Panthajada. He further reports the submission of Terai region by Sikh Maharaja Ranjit Singh and subsequent hostility by hill Rajas towards Gorkhalis. Ranajit also mentions that his son Rewanta Kunwar wrote about the then existing economic problems in military management at Kumaun region.

On Ashadh Sudi 1, 1870, General Bhimsen Thapa was granted 30 ropanis and 5 annas of land at Lagantol under inheritable Birta-Bitalab tenure for the construction of a house. Among the Bharadars (courtiers) who were present for the demarcation of the boundary, Kaji Ranajit Kunwar was also present there. As a Kaji, Ranajit issued administrative order to Chautariyas Atmarama Padhya and Tilakarama Padhya of Udayapur in Pyuthan to restore Hulak (mail) posts and repair suspension bridges at Arthala as per the letter dated Bhadra Badi 14, 1871 V.S.

Allowances, Grants and Levies
Kaji Ranajit Kanwar received NRs 1000 allowance while working as military commander in Kumaun region in 1866 Vikram Samvat. He received 200 muris of land grants on Manachamal tenure by a royal order was issued in Aswin Badi 13, 1862. Ranajit was among the highest ranked Bharadar (state-bearing officer) of the government of Nepal in the year 1861 Vikram Samvat (1804/05 CE). Thus, he was charged NRs. 272.25 as special Salami levy to repay the loans incurred by former King Rana Bahadur Shah during the four year (1800-1804 CE) stay at Banaras.

Death
As per Rana genealogy mentioned by Christopher Buyers, he died from the wounds received in the assault of the Jhabesar in Kangra on 1815 A.D. Chronicler Daniel Wright contends that Ranajit died in the conquest of Kangra while storming at Jhapabesar in Kumaon. He was hit by a bullet in the right chest aged 58 years when he was climbing a bamboo ladder at the wall.

Descendants

The table produced by Kumar Pradhan shows the three sons of Ranajit - Bal Narsingh Kunwar, Balaram and Rewant. Bal Narsingh Kunwar was political aide of Bhimsen Thapa. His son Jung Bahadur Kunwar became Prime Minister of Nepal. The appointment letter of Jung Bahadur Kunwar as Prime Minister of Nepal, confirms that he was son of Bal Narsingh Kunwar and a grandson of Ranajit Kunwar. Furthermore, the appointment of Bam Bahadur Kunwar as Kaji also mentions Bal Narsingh Kunwar as his father and Ranajit Kunwar as his grandfather. After proclaiming descent from Ranas of Mewar, Jung Bahadur Kunwar adopted the title of Kunwar Ranaji on 15 May 1848 and became Maharaja (Great King) of Kaski and Lamjung on 6 August 1856.

References

Footnotes

Notes

Books

Further reading

1753 births
1815 deaths
Nepalese military personnel
History of Himachal Pradesh
Gurkhas
Deaths by firearm in India
Assassinated military personnel
Assassinated people
Khas people